San Felipe Tejalapam  is a town and municipality in Oaxaca in south-western Mexico. The municipality covers an area of 76.55 km². 
It is part of the Etla District in the Valles Centrales region.

As of 2005, the municipality had a total population of 6221.
The municipality includes part of the Benito Juárez National Park.

References

Municipalities of Oaxaca